Julia von Heinz (born 3 June 1976 in West Berlin) is a German film director and screenwriter.

Life and work
From 2005 to 2006, Julia von Heinz worked as a personal assistant for the director and professor Rosa von Praunheim at the Konrad Wolf Film University of Babelsberg.

Her debut feature film Nothing Else Matters, a coming of age-drama, premiered at the Berlin International Film Festival in 2007, was shown at numerous international festivals and won awards. After that, she shot the documentary film Standesgemäß (2008) about single aristocratic women. In 2012, her children's film Hanni & Nanni 2, based on the series of novels by Enid Blyton, was released successfully in cinemas. Together with the directors Tom Tykwer, Chris Kraus, Robert Thalheim and Axel Ranisch, she made the documentary film Pink Children (2012) about their common mentor Rosa von Praunheim. Also in 2012 von Heinz received her Ph.D. with a concentration in Film and teaches at the University of Television and Film Munich. In addition to teaching, she continues to make films. Her greatest international success to date was And Tomorrow the Entire World (2020). In this feature film she processed her own experiences as a teenager in Antifa.

Awards (selection) 
 2008: Special Jury Award at the Torino International Gay & Lesbian Film Festival (Nothing Else Matters)
 2009: Bavarian TV Award (Standesgemäß)
 2012: Golden Sparrow of the Children's Jury at the German Children's-Film & TV-Festival (Hanni and Nanni 2)
 2020: Nomination for the Golden Lion at the Venice Film Festival  (And Tomorrow the Entire World)
 2021: Bavarian Film Award (And Tomorrow the Entire World)
 2021: Film Award of the City of Hof (Honorary Award) at the Hof International Film Festival

Filmography (selection) 
 2001: Dienstags
 2007: Nothing Else Matters
 2008: Standesgemäß
 2012: Hanni and Nanni 2
 2012: Pink Children
 2013: 
 2015: I'm Off Then
 2020: And Tomorrow the Entire World
 2021: Eldorado KaDeWe (mini-series)

References

External links

1976 births
Living people
Film people from Berlin